Roy Brown III is the third album from Puerto Rican folk singer Roy Brown. The album was released by Disco Libre in 1973. It also features the first collaboration between Brown and Cuban singer/songwriter Silvio Rodríguez.

Background

Roy Brown III is notable for being the first album to feature collaborations between Brown and Cuban singer/songwriter Silvio Rodríguez. The album features Rodríguez' songs "Canción del elegido" and "Oda a mi generación". The former was already featured in the album 26 de julio: Los Nuevos Héroes, which features songs by Rodríguez, Pablo Milanés, and Noel Nicola. Brown and Rodríguez would continue collaborating through their careers several times.

The album also features the song "Al frente", which is inspired by a poem of Puerto Rican nationalist Hugo Margenat. Roy Brown III also features singing contributions by Antonio Cabán Vale "El Topo", Andrés Jiménez, and Rodolfo Gandía, among others.

Track listing

Personnel

Musicians 
 Antonio Cabán Vale - co-lead vocals on "Oda a una generación"
 Henry Vázquez - guitars and quinto
 Rucco Gandía - bass
 Roy Brown - guitars

Recording and production 
 Pedrito Enríquez - engineer

Notes 

1973 albums
Roy Brown (Puerto Rican musician) albums